DOL may refer to:

David O'Leary (born 1958), Irish football manager and former player
Deauville – Saint-Gatien Airport (IATA code)
Degree of Operating Leverage, a measure of operating leverage - how revenue growth translates into growth in operating income
Department of Labor
Direct on line starter, starter starts electric motors by applying the full line voltage to the motor terminals
Duke of Lancaster's Regiment, one of the new large infantry regiments of the British Army
DOL, the product code used by Nintendo for GameCube hardware and software, a reference to the platform's prototype name of Dolphin. It is also used as a filename extension in GameCube and Wii software.
Division of labour
Dream Out Loud, an Indian rock band
1,3-dioxolane, a chemical component with chemical formula (CH2)2O2CH2

See also
Dol (disambiguation)
Dolnet.gr, company publication website of Lambrakis Press Group, a media group in Greece